Tesei is a surname. Notable people with the surname include:

Donatella Tesei (born 1958), Italian politician and lawyer
Teseo Tesei (1909–1941), Italian naval officer

See also
 Villa Tesei, town in Argentina